The National Stadium of Costa Rica is a multi-purpose stadium in La Sabana Metropolitan Park, San José, Costa Rica. It is the first modern sport and event arena to be built in Central America. The stadium was completed in 2011 and officially opened its doors to the public on March 26 that year, with a capacity of 35,175 seats. The stadium replaced the original National Stadium, and is the home stadium of the Costa Rica national football team.

It has one high-definition  screen, located in the southern section of the stadium, along with a smaller monochromatic screen, and another monochromatic screen of the same dimensions in the northern section.

It was used to host matches during the 2014 FIFA U-17 Women's World Cup, including the opening game, the third place match and the Final.

It was used to host matches during the 2022 FIFA U-20 Women's World Cup, including the opening game and the Final.

It hosted the first show of Coldplay's Music of the Spheres World Tour due to the green credentials of the country.

Funding and Construction

The initial cost was $88 million, it grew to $100 million.

The Chinese government financed the construction, furnishing, and general costs of the stadium on their own. The old National Stadium was demolished on May 12, 2008, after UCR (Universidad de Costa Rica) vs. Brujas FC match and a 200M race where Nery Brenes set a new national record (20:28 seconds).

The president of Costa Rica, Óscar Arias and the leader of People's Republic of China Hu Jintao, agreed to build the stadium during Arias' first visit to China in October 2007. The construction began on March 12, 2009, and it finished in 2011.

The Chinese company Anhui Foreign Economic Construction was in charge of the construction of the stadium. About 800 Chinese workers immigrated.

Inauguration

The grand inauguration ceremony occurred on March 26, 2011. National and international sports activities and entertainment went on through April 10. An official stadium inauguration website was created, which informed the population of all inaugurating events.

The main inaugurating event was a friendly association football match between Costa Rica and China, which ended 2–2, with Álvaro Saborío scoring the first goal ever in the stadium.

During 2011, the new stadium was subject of a heavy investment made by the Costa Rican Football Federation to propel Costa Rican football into the world scene. To do this, the federation organized friendly matches against previous FIFA World Cup winners Argentina, Brazil, and Spain, with the latter being the then most recent winners of the tournament.

Football tournaments

2013 Copa Centroamericana
The Estadio Nacional hosted all 14 matches of the 2013 Copa Centroamericana.

2014 FIFA U-17 Women's World Cup
El Nacional hosted nine games of the 2014 FIFA U-17 Women's World Cup. It hosted four Group A matches; including the opener, a Group C and Group D game, two quarterfinal matches, the 3rd place play-off and the final. The games were:

2022 FIFA U-20 Women's World Cup
Estadio Nacional hosted eighteen games of the 2022 FIFA U-20 Women's World Cup. It hosted four Group A matches, two Group B games, four Group C games, and two Group D games, two quarterfinal matches, two semifinal matches, the 3rd place play-off and the final. The games were:

Concerts

Fire incident
During the opening ceremony of the 2013 Central American Games, a fire broke out in the stadium because of a stray firework which hit the western part of the stadium roof. The fire damaged some lighting equipments but the stadium was still used for the Games.

Panorama view

References

External links
Official website

Football venues in San José, Costa Rica
Athletics (track and field) venues in Costa Rica
Costa Rica
Multi-purpose stadiums in Costa Rica
Sports venues completed in 2011
Estadio Nacional de Costa Rica
Estadio Nacional de Costa Rica
Estadio Nacional de Costa Rica
CONCACAF Gold Cup stadiums